The Taming of the West is a lost 1925 American silent Western film directed by Arthur Rosson and starring top cowboy star Hoot Gibson.

Cast
 Hoot Gibson - John Carleton
 Marceline Day - Beryl
 Morgan Brown - Terrence Weaver
 Edwin Booth Tilton - John P. Carleton
 Herbert Prior - Old Man King
 Louise Hippe - Perry Potter
 Albert J. Smith - Lafe Conners
 Francis Ford - Frosty Miller
 Frona Hale - Aunt Lodenna

See also
 Hoot Gibson filmography

References

External links
 The Taming of the West at IMDb.com
 

1925 films
Lost Western (genre) films
Films directed by Arthur Rosson
Universal Pictures films
1925 Western (genre) films
Lost American films
American black-and-white films
1925 lost films
Silent American Western (genre) films
1920s American films
1920s English-language films